Nora Ekberg (commonly known as Little Sis Nora; born August 30, 1996) is a Swedish singer and songwriter. She is the younger sister of AronChupa and is a member of his band Albatraoz.

Biography 
She was born August 30, 1996 in Borås. They grew up in a family full of musicians and attended Santa Rosa Junior College in 2015. That same year she sung at Ultra Music Festival after creating “I’m an Albatroz” with her brother, Aron Ekberg.

Career 
She debuted as being the singer of I’m an Albatroz which became a worldwide success.

She then sung on another song with her brother AronChupa titled “Rave in the Grave”. Later on 2019 they both released a single called “Hole in the Roof”.

In 2020 her and Aron released “The Woodchuck Song” which charted at 83 on the Swedish Top Singles 100. In 2021 she released a solo single called “Rave in my Garage” to drown out the depression associated with the lockdowns of the COVID-19 pandemic. The following year in 2022, her and Aron released a single titled “Booty Call”.

Discography 
Singles (with AronChupa)

 “I’m an Albatraoz” (2014)
 “Grandpa’s Groove” (2016)
 “Little Swing” (2016)
 “Llama in my Living Room” (2017)
 “Rave in the Grave” (2018)
 “Hole in the Roof” (2019)
 “The Woodchuck Song” (2020)

Singles (solo)

 “Fun” (2020)
 “Rave In My Garage” (2021)
 “MDMA” (2021)
 “Samurai” (2022)

References 

Living people
Swedish musicians
Swedish singers
1996 births